Suuremõisa Bay Nature Reserve is a nature reserve which is located in Saare County, Estonia.

The area of the nature reserve is 416 ha.

The protected area was founded in 1965 on the basis of Suuremõisa Bay Ornithological Prohibited Area. In 2017 the protected area was designated to the nature reserve.

References

Nature reserves in Estonia
Geography of Saare County